Mark Abraham Bright (born 6 June 1962) is an English sports correspondent and former footballer.

Born to a Gambian father and English mother, he was adopted into a foster family in Stoke-on-Trent at an early age. He played non-league football for local side Leek Town, before joining nearby Football League side Port Vale in 1981. He turned professional at the club the following year, though would only enjoy an extended run in the first-team during the 1983–84 season. He signed with First Division club Leicester City in June 1984. He failed to find success with Leicester however and was sold on to Crystal Palace in November 1986. He helped Palace to win promotion out of the Second Division via the play-offs in 1989 and went on to play on the losing side of the 1990 FA Cup final, before winning the Full Members' Cup in 1991. Building an effective strike partnership with Ian Wright, he scored 114 goals in 286 league and cup games for Crystal Palace and was also named on the PFA Second Division Team of the Year in 1987–88 and as the club's Player of The Year in 1990.

He was sold to Premier League rivals Sheffield Wednesday for a fee of £1,375,000 in September 1992, where he would stay for the next five years, scoring a further 70 goals in 170 games in all competitions. He featured in the 1993 League Cup final and 1993 FA Cup final, which ended in defeat to Arsenal both times. He lost his first-team place in the 1996–97 season and was loaned out to Millwall, also spending time at Swiss club Sion, who were unable to play him in competitive fixtures after failing to come to an agreement with Sheffield Wednesday. He eventually signed with Charlton Athletic in March 1997 and helped the club to win promotion to the Premier League with victory in the 1998 First Division play-off final, before announcing his retirement the following year shortly before his 38th-birthday. After retiring as a player he worked as a pundit on various television and radio programmes. He married singer Michelle Gayle in 1996 and divorced in 2007; they have one son.

Early life
Bright was born in Stoke-on-Trent, to Edwin Bright, a forklift truck driver from The Gambia, and Maureen Bright, a white English woman. His mother left home in November 1964, and his father put Bright and his brother, Phillip, up for adoption. His first foster home was with Helena Parton, where he and his brother stayed with while his sisters lived with his mother, who divorced Edwin in 1968. Parton ceased fostering the two boys in 1969 after she developed health problems and the boys went on to live with a new foster family in Kidsgrove, Bob and Irene Davies, who were experienced foster parents. The rest of his childhood was relatively happy and stable under their care until he left home at the age of 18. As the only black children at Dove Bank Primary, the two brothers were a target for bullies and were put in the same class to help the pair feel more comfortable. A clumsy attempt to combat the racism from the headteacher in a school assembly worked and the boys began to be accepted by the other children due to their natural footballing ability. Roy Bright, frontman of rock band Exit State, claims to be a half-brother of Mark Bright.

Football career

Port Vale
Bright spent a year as a youth-team player at Port Vale before being released at the age of 16. He then played part-time football at Cheshire County League outfit Leek Town and for Sunday league side Mason's Arms, before he rejoined Port Vale as an amateur in October 1981 on the recommendation of Mason's Arms co-manager Russell Bromage. Manager John McGrath handed him his full debut on the last day of the 1981–82 season, in a 2–0 win over Torquay United at Vale Park, two weeks after coming on as a substitute in a goalless home draw with York City on 1 May 1982. In the game against Torquay, he provided as assist for Paul Bowles, although missed an opportunity to score himself, telling a local reporter that, "I was waiting for the ball to bounce instead of having a go straight away". He went on to sign an initial one-year part-time contract on £10-a-week, while also working as an apprentice for Staffs Hydraulics in Kidsgrove.

He played just once in the 1982–83 Fourth Division promotion campaign, scoring Vale's second goal in a 2–0 home win over Hereford United on 9 October. At the end of the season he turned down an initial full-time professional contract offer as it paid less than his factory job, though he did sign a revised offer of £110-a-week with appearances and goal incentives. Bright came to prominence for the "Valiants" under the stewardship of new boss John Rudge towards the end of the 1983–84 season, scoring ten goals in 31 games, though this was not enough to save the club from relegation out of the Third Division. Graham Barnett advised him to reject John Rudge's offer of a two-year contract, and Bright was consequently sold to Leicester City for £33,333 in June 1984. This fee was later doubled due to a top-up clause. Bright turned down a contract offer from Sheffield Wednesday manager Howard Wilkinson as he had already promised Leicester manager Gordon Milne he would sign for Leicester.

Leicester City
Bright's contract with Leicester ran for three years and earned him £300-a-week, nearly tripling his Port Vale wages, as well giving him a £10,000 signing-on bonus. The "Foxes" struggled in the lower half of the First Division table in the 1984–85 season and Bright was limited to 18 appearances and spent most of his time on the bench as Gary Lineker and Alan Smith were the club's established strike partnership. Lineker finished as the First Division's top-scorer, but was sold to Everton in summer 1985, leaving Bright with an opportunity to establish himself in the starting eleven at Filbert Street. Bright opened the 1985–86 season by scoring two goals in a 3–1 home win over Everton. However, he struggled to match this performance for the rest of the campaign and lost confidence, which was worsened when a section of the Leicester crowd turned on him with racially aggravated abuse.

At a low point in his career, he was diagnosed with depression after seeking treatment for sleeping problems. Milne was moved upstairs at Leicester at the start of the 1986–87 season to become the club's general manager and Bright was not rated by new manager Bryan Hamilton. Bright turned down the offer of a move to Brian Horton's Hull City, as he did not want to move too far north, although took Horton's advice to ask Leicester for a move as the club were not willing to let Bright reach 50 club appearances and so trigger another top-up payment to Port Vale.

Crystal Palace
Bright was signed to Crystal Palace by manager Steve Coppell for a £75,000 fee on 13 November 1986. The initial contract was only a temporary three-month deal as there were medical concerns with his Osteitis pubis, meaning that if he was unfit at the end of this period he would be returned to Leicester. However, he went on to sign a permanent contract after completing the trial period. Palace already had a successful strike partnership in Ian Wright and Andy Gray, though Coppell moved Gray into central midfield to accommodate Bright up front. The "Eagles" were pressing for promotion out of the Second Division, but finished two points outside the play-offs in 1986–87. Bright was named on the PFA Team of the Year and earned the Golden Boot for the highest scorer in the division in 1987–88 with 24 goals, although the club finished one place and two points outside of the play-offs. A third-place finish in 1988–89 secured them a place in the play-offs and Bright scored in the semi-final victory over Swindon Town, which helped Palace to reach the play-off final; Palace then beat Blackburn Rovers 4–3 on aggregate to win promotion to the top-flight.

Palace competed well in the First Division, except for the trip to Anfield where they were beaten by a club-record 9–0 margin by Liverpool, an experience Bright described as "numbing". He ended the 1989–90 season with 12 league goals, including a brace against Manchester United at Old Trafford, helping the team to finish five points above the relegation zone. The club's greatest achievement would come in the FA Cup however, as they gained revenge on Liverpool by beating them 4–3 after extra-time in the semi-finals at Villa Park to secure a place in the 1990 FA Cup final, with Bright scoring the first of Palace's four goals. The club's first ever FA Cup final appearance, they held Manchester United to a replay after an initial 3–3 draw at Wembley Stadium, but lost the replay 1–0 to a late Lee Martin goal as Alex Ferguson won his first trophy as Manchester United manager. Bright was particularly disappointed as he felt he had not performed in the original game. One consolation for Bright was that he was named as Crystal Palace's Player of The Year for the 1989–90 season.

As Palace impressed in the First Division throughout 1990–91, Bright proved his predatory skills at the highest level with a sequence of seven top-flight goals in just ten midwinter games as the "Eagles" secured their highest ever league finish of third. The potency of Bright and Wright's partnership was demonstrated on 25 September, when both players scored hat-tricks in an 8–0 win over Southend United at Selhurst Park in the League Cup. Palace went on to win the Full Members' Cup, beating Bristol Rovers, Brighton & Hove Albion, Luton Town, Norwich City and then Everton in the Wembley final, with Wright scoring a brace in extra-time. After Wright had left the club, Bright continued his great form for Palace and hit a total of 22 goals in the 1991–92 season. However, Coppell failed to adequately replace Wright, and Marco Gabbiadini was bought and sold on within the space of four months for a loss of £600,000. Bright scored on the opening day of the 1992–93 season, the start of the newly created Premier League, before being sold on to Sheffield Wednesday.

Sheffield Wednesday
Bright joined Sheffield Wednesday on 11 September 1992 in a cash plus player exchange deal involving fellow striker Paul Williams that was rated at a total transfer value of £1,375,000. The Wednesday players were experienced and at the peak of their careers; manager Trevor Francis was eager to win trophies at Hillsborough and felt Bright would prove a good partner to club stalwart David Hirst, particularly with the highly talented Chris Waddle in midfield. After scoring six goals in the League Cup, Bright played in the League Cup final, which ended in a 2–1 defeat to Arsenal. Wednesday also reached the final of the FA Cup, where they would again face Arsenal, with Bright scoring an extra-time header against derby rivals Sheffield United to secure victory in the semi-finals. The final proved to be a disappointment however, as he controversially elbowed Arsenal defender Andy Linighan in the face, causing a broken nose. Later, with the scores level in the last minute of extra time, a heavily bandaged Linighan out-jumped Bright from a corner to score the winning goal. After the game, Bright phoned Linighan to apologise.

Bright finished as the club's top-scorer for three consecutive seasons, eventually became the "Owls" highest goalscorer in the Premier League as of December 2019, scoring 48 goals between 1992 and 1996. With 19 goals, he was the Premier League's seventh-highest scorer in 1993–94. He then hit 13 goals in the 1994–95 season, in Francis's last season in charge. He signed a new two-year contract in summer 1995, having rejected an approach from West Ham United manager Harry Redknapp. Wednesday then finished 15th in the league in 1995–96 under the stewardship of David Pleat, with Bright scoring 14 goals in all competitions despite playing a complete league game only 15 times. Pleat paid £2.7 million for Huddersfield Town forward Andy Booth in July 1996, signalling the end of Bright's time at Hillsborough. Having been almost entirely frozen out of the first-team during the 1996–97 season, Bright was loaned to South London derby rivals Millwall in the Second Division and scored on his debut for the "Lions" in a 1–1 draw at AFC Bournemouth.

Bright began training with Swiss club Sion in January 1997. He left soon after due to unpaid wages and issues with his transfer fee with Sheffield Wednesday. Despite being unwanted at Leicester, the club still demanded a transfer fee of £60,000, which Sion chairman Christian Constantin refused to pay, which meant that Bright trained with the squad at Stade Tourbillon but was unable to feature in any competitive games. Despite this, he enjoyed his time training under manager Alberto Bigon and alongside Roberto Assis, the elder brother and later agent of Ronaldinho.

Charlton Athletic
Bright eventually signed with Charlton Athletic in March 1997 on a contract to run until the end of the 1996–97 season. After two substitute appearances, he scored a brace in his first start for the "Addicks", in a 2–1 win over Portsmouth at The Valley on 19 April. Manager Alan Curbishley was keen on experienced players to bolster his young squad, therefore signed Bright to a one-year deal in the summer. He scored seven goals in the 1997–98 campaign to help Charlton to a fourth-place finish in the First Division and a place in the play-offs. Charlton overcame Ipswich Town in the semi-finals and then beat Sunderland in the play-off final, which was won 7–6 on penalties after a 4–4 draw; Bright started the final, although did not take a penalty in the shoot-out as he was taken off in extra-time. He then agreed a new one-year contract, accepting a role mainly as a squad player and experienced pro for the younger players to learn from. Charlton failed to survive in the Premier League however, and Bright retired from professional football at the end of the 1998–99 season. Bright wrote in his autobiography that he earned a total of £1.2 million from his 18-year career as a professional player.

Media career
After retiring, Bright became a football correspondent on The Big Breakfast and co-presented The Wright Bright Show with former teammate Ian Wright on BBC Radio 5 Live. He also commentates on some international matches, often alongside Jonathan Pearce and Steve Wilson on Match of the Day. He has worked as a sports correspondent for the BBC on BBC London News, Football Focus, Fighting Talk, 5 live Sport, and on Final Score. He has also provided punditry for Match magazine and British Eurosport. In summer 2009, he joined the Crystal Palace academy set-up, along with his former teammate John Salako. He was inducted into the City of Stoke-on-Trent Hall of Fame in 2019. He published his autobiography, My Story - from foster care to footballer, in November 2019.

Personal life

He met British singer and actress Michelle Gayle in 1995 and the couple married in Las Vegas the following year. They divorced in 2007, although they remain as friends. Their son, Isaiah, was born in April 2000. Bright has completed six half marathons since his retirement in 1999, all of them in the Great North Run. He is also a regular competitor in the London Marathon, raising funds for cancer research in 2000, the Willow Foundation in 2005 and The Rhys Daniels Trust in 2006.

Career statistics
Source:

Honours
Port Vale
Football League Fourth Division third-place promotion: 1982–83

Crystal Palace
Full Members' Cup: 1990–91
Football League Second Division play-offs: 1989
FA Cup runner-up: 1989–90

Sheffield Wednesday
FA Cup runner-up: 1992–93
Football League Cup runner-up: 1992–93

Charlton Athletic
Football League First Division play-offs: 1998

Individual
PFA Second Division Team of the Year: 1987–88
Crystal Palace Player of the Year: 1990

References

General

1962 births
Living people
English people of Gambian descent
Footballers from Stoke-on-Trent
English adoptees
Association football forwards
English footballers
Black British sportsmen
People of Gambian Creole descent
Gambian Creole people
Leek Town F.C. players
Port Vale F.C. players
Leicester City F.C. players
Crystal Palace F.C. players
Sheffield Wednesday F.C. players
Millwall F.C. players
FC Sion players
Charlton Athletic F.C. players
English Football League players
Premier League players
English expatriate footballers
English expatriate sportspeople in Switzerland
Expatriate footballers in Switzerland
BBC sports presenters and reporters
English television presenters
English association football commentators
English autobiographers
FA Cup Final players